Tammam is both a given name and a surname. People with the name include:

Given name
Tammam ibn Alkama al-Wazir (fl. 9th century), Umayyad poet
Tammam Hassan (1918-2011), Egyptian linguist
Tammam Raad (born 1965), Syrian politician
Tammam Salam (born 1945), Lebanese politician

Family name
Abu Tammam (788–845), Arab poet
Abul Ashba ibn Tammam (died 1361), Muslim chemist
Abu Ghalib Tammam ibn Alkama (fl. 8th–9th century), Umayyad general in Spain

Surname
Lucy Tammam, British fashion designer

See also
Tamam (disambiguation)